José Egas dos Santos Branco (born 7 January 1987), known as Zequinha, is a Portuguese professional footballer who plays for Vitória F.C. as a forward.

Club career
Born in Setúbal, Zequinha was an unsuccessful youth graduate at FC Porto. He went on to serve consecutive loans in the following three years after having appeared for their reserves – and only three times – in both the country's second and third divisions (G.D. Tourizense, F.C. Penafiel, Gondomar S.C. and Gil Vicente FC).

In the summer of 2009, Zequinha was released and joined Primeira Liga newcomers S.C. Olhanense on a free transfer, penning a three-year contract. He made his debut in the competition on 16 August, playing 72 minutes in a 0–0 away draw against Associação Naval 1º de Maio.

Zequinha moved abroad in July 2011, signing for two years with Athlitiki Enosi Larissa F.C. in Greece. After two seasons in division two he signed with Panthrakikos F.C. in the Super League where he stayed until 7 January 2014, signing with his very first club Vitória F.C. three days later and renewing his contract for three years in December 2014.

On 11 August 2017, Zequinha joined Indian Super League franchise ATK from C.D. Nacional.

International career
Zequinha represented Portugal at the 2007 FIFA U-20 World Cup in Canada, playing and starting all four matches for the team, albeit without scoring. In the round-of-16 defeat against Chile (1–0), he stripped referee Subkhiddin Mohd Salleh of his red card as the official was going to send his teammate Mano off; subsequently he received his marching orders as well, and both players were suspended from international football, Zequinha for one year.

Club statistics

References

External links

1987 births
Living people
Sportspeople from Setúbal
Portuguese footballers
Association football forwards
Primeira Liga players
Liga Portugal 2 players
Segunda Divisão players
FC Porto B players
G.D. Tourizense players
F.C. Penafiel players
Gondomar S.C. players
Gil Vicente F.C. players
S.C. Olhanense players
C.D. Fátima players
Vitória F.C. players
F.C. Arouca players
C.D. Nacional players
Super League Greece players
Football League (Greece) players
Athlitiki Enosi Larissa F.C. players
Panthrakikos F.C. players
Indian Super League players
ATK (football club) players
Portugal youth international footballers
Portuguese expatriate footballers
Expatriate footballers in Greece
Expatriate footballers in India
Portuguese expatriate sportspeople in Greece
Portuguese expatriate sportspeople in India